Nebesa (Czech "skies", Russian Небеса "heaven") may refer to:

Nebesa, Aš, village in Czech Republic
Nebesa, book by John the Exarch one of the first non-liturgical Slavonic books
Nebesa, album by Marina Kapuro